David A. Schauer, ScD, CHP, is Executive Director Emeritus of the National Council on Radiation Protection and Measurements (NCRP). During his tenure a number of updated and new publications were issued by the Council.

Biography
Schauer received his doctor of science (Sc. D.) degree from Johns Hopkins University and is a diplomate of the American Board of Health Physics. He received M.S. and B.S. degrees from Georgetown and Liberty Universities, respectively. Prior to being elected NCRP secretary and treasurer, and appointed Executive Director (2004 to 2012), Dr. Schauer served in various scientific and leadership positions as an officer in the U.S. Navy (1984 to 2004). His primary research interests include thermoluminescent dosimetry and electron paramagnetic resonance biodosimetry. He is a member of numerous organizations including the American Society of Association Executives, the American College of Radiology, and the Health Physics Society.

Schauer has published a number of scientific articles, proceedings and reports individually and in collaboration with fellow scientists and students. He also contributed book chapters to the "Handbook of Radioactivity Analysis" published by Elsevier Academic Press (2003) and "Advances in Medical Physics: 2012" published by Medical Physics Publishing (2012).

Early years
Schauer's formal education began in 1965 with the creation of President Johnson's Head Start Program.  This was part of Johnson's War on Poverty. As one of five children being raised in a single-parent home, Schauer was sent to the newly established Head Start Program in Williamstown, NJ.  So began Schauer's formal education which would include a stop in a two-room schoolhouse for kindergarten (Hall Street) and culminate at Hopkins with the awarding of his doctorate in 1994.

College years and beyond

Following graduation from Williamstown High School (1979) where he was named scholar athlete, Schauer was recruited to pitch at Liberty University.  Schauer was used mostly as a starter and set the single game record for strikeouts until a hard-throwing lefthander (Randy Tomlin – Pittsburgh Pirates and pitching coach for the AA Harrisburg Nats) arrived a few years later and established a new mark.  During his years at Liberty, Schauer was coached by former major league pitcher, Al Worthington, and played with Sid Bream, Lee Guetterman and Darrell Manuel (youngest brother of Phillies manager, Charlie Manuel).  The Liberty baseball teams of the early 1980s made three successive trips to the NAIA college world series in Lubbock, TX.

Following graduation from Liberty in 1983, Schauer was commissioned as an ensign in the US Navy Medical Service Corps.  Ensign Schauer worked his way up the ranks before retiring at the beginning of 2004 as a Commander.  During those 20 years, Schauer served in various leadership positions in San Diego, CA, Portsmouth, NH and Bethesda, MD.

NCRP publications issued during his tenure as Executive Director
 Report No. 145 (2003) Radiation Protection in Dentistry
 Report No. 146 (2004) Approaches to Risk Management in Remediation of Radioactively Contaminated Sites
 Report No. 147 (2004) Structural Shielding Design for Medical X-Ray Imaging Facilities
 Report No. 148 (2004) Radiation Protection in Veterinary Medicine
 Report No. 149 (2004) A Guide to Mammography and Other Breast Imaging Procedures
 Report No. 150 (2005) Extrapolation of Radiation-induced Cancer Risks from Nonhuman Experimental Systems to Humans
 Report No. 151 (2005) Structural Shielding Design and Evaluation for Megavoltage X- and Gamma-Ray Radiotherapy Facilities
 Report No. 152 (2005) Performance Assessment of Near-Surface Facilities for Disposal of Low-Level Radioactive Waste
 Report No. 153 (2006) Information Needed to Make Radiation Protection Recommendations for Space Missions Beyond Low-Earth Orbit
 Report No. 154 (2006) Cesium-137 in the Environment: Radioecology and Approaches to Assessment and Management
 Report No. 155 (2006) Management of Radionuclide Therapy Patients
 Report No. 156 (2006) Development of a Biokinetic Model for Radionuclide-Contaminated Wounds and Procedures for Their Assessment, Dosimetry and Treatment
 Report No. 157 (2007) Radiation Protection in Educational Institutions
 Report No. 158 (2007) Uncertainties in the Measurement and Dosimetry of External Radiation
 Report No. 159 – Risk to the Thyroid from Ionizing Radiation (2008)
 Report No. 160 – Ionizing Radiation Exposure of the Population of the United States (2009) 
 Report No. 161 – Management of Persons Contaminated With Radionuclides: Handbook
 Report No. 162 – Self Assessment of Radiation-Safety Programs
 Commentary No. 19 (2005) Key Elements of Preparing Emergency Responders for Nuclear and Radiological Terrorism
 Commentary No. 20 (2007) Radiation Protection and Measurement Issues Related to Cargo Scanning with Accelerator-Produced High-Energy X Rays
 Statement No. 10 (2004) Recent Applications of the NCRP Public Dose Limit Recommendation for Ionizing Radiation
 2003 Annual Meeting Proceedings (2004) Health Phys., 87, No. 3.
 2004 Annual Meeting Proceedings (2005) Health Phys., 89, No. 5.
 2005 Annual Meeting Proceedings (2006) Health Phys., 91, No. 5.
 2006 Annual Meeting Proceedings (2007) Health Phys., 93, No. 5.
 2007 Annual Meeting Proceedings (2008) Health Phys., 95, No. 5.

Military/professional training
 1984	US Navy Officer Indoctrination School, Newport, RI
 1984	US Navy Radiation Health Officers Course, Naval Undersea Medicine Institute, Groton, CT
 1984	Combat Casualty Care (C4), Ft. Sam Houston, San Antonio, TX
 1985	Medical Effects of Nuclear Weapons, Armed Forces Radiobiology Research Institute (AFRRI), Bethesda, MD
 1986	Senior Officers Nuclear Accidents Course, Air Force Nuclear Weapons Training School (AFNWTS), Albuquerque, NM
 1987	Planning for Nuclear Emergencies, Harvard School of Public Health, Boston, MA
 1988	Pathologic Effects of Radiation, Armed Forces Institute of Pathology, Washington, DC
 1988	Nuclear Weapons Orientation Advanced,  AFNWTS, Albuquerque, NM
 1990	Medical Department Intermediate Leadership, Management, Education and Training Course, NSHS, Bethesda, MD
 1998	Project Management College, Naval Sea Systems Command, Washington, DC
 1999	Radioactivity in the Environment: Risk, Assessment, and Measurement, Harvard School of Public Health, Boston, MA
 2000	MR Imaging: A Seminar for Medical Physicists, Baltimore, MD
 2005	Accreditation Board on Engineering and Technology, Program Evaluator Training, Spokane, WA

Research grants
David A. Schauer's research activities include;
 "Mobile emergency-response in vivo EPR dosimetry system", collaboration with Dartmouth Medical Center and NIST, funded by Defense Threat Reduction Agency (DTRA), FY02-03 – $325k.
 Establishment of “Department of Defense Electron Paramagnetic Resonance Forensic Radiation Biodosimetry Laboratory”, funded by DTRA, FY02-03 – $463k.
 Various grants and contracts with CDC, DHS, DOD, DOE, NASA, Navy, NCI, NIST and NRC in support of NCRP's scientific program, annual budget in 2007 – $2.9M.

Public service
Dr. Schauer is an Editorial Board member of the following journals:
 Radiation Measurements
 Radiation Protection Dosimetry
 Egyptian Journal of Biophysics
 Indian Journal of Radiation Research

He also serves as a referee for the following journals: 
 Health Physics
 Radiation Physics and Chemistry
 Radiation Research

Television appearances:
 March 18, 2011, CNN HLN, Nancy Grace Show, Fukushima Daiichi Nuclear Reactor Accident, Potential Impact on the United States.
 March 21, 2011, CNN HLN, Nancy Grace Show, Fukushima Daiichi Nuclear Reactor Accident, Control of Contaminated Food Imports From Japan to the United States

References

Sources

1. https://web.archive.org/web/20081010152258/http://www.ncrponline.org/Members/Schauer_bio.html Retrieved on September 25, 2008
2. https://web.archive.org/web/20080516091228/http://myprofile.cos.com/dschauer Retrieved on September 25, 2008
3. https://web.archive.org/web/20110721083404/http://www.ncrponline.org/Press_Rel/WHO_June2008.pdf Retrieved on September 25, 2008
4. http://www.linkedin.com/pub/6/a68/91b Retrieved on September 25, 2008
5. https://archive.today/20130203132502/http://center.spoke.com/info/pAMw38P/DavidSchauer
6. https://web.archive.org/web/20080921211948/http://dceg.cancer.gov/files/reb2004/Schauer.pdf Retrieved on September 25, 2008
7. http://lib.bioinfo.pl/auth:Schauer,DA Retrieved on September 25, 2008
8. http://explore.georgetown.edu/people/ds37/ Retrieved on September 25, 2008

External links
 NCRP website
 NCRP Web-Store

1961 births
Radiobiologists
Radiation health effects researchers
Georgetown University alumni
Living people
Johns Hopkins University alumni
United States Navy Medical Corps officers
Liberty Flames baseball players